Bruno Lebras (born 30 October 1962) is a French former professional cyclist who specialized in cyclo-cross. He most notably won the bronze medal in the elite race at the 1990 and 1991 UCI Cyclo-cross World Championships.

Major results

Cyclo-cross

1979–1980
 3rd  National Junior Championships
1981–1982
 1st  National Amateur Championships
1986–1987
 1st 
1987–1988
 1st  National Amateur Championships
 1st Overall Challenge National
1988–1989
 1st  National Amateur Championships
1989–1990
 3rd  UCI World Championships
 3rd National Championships
1990–1991
 1st  National Championships
 1st Overall Challenge National
 3rd  UCI World Championships

MTB
1988
 1st 
1990
 1st Roc d'Azur
1992
 1st  National XCO Championships
 1st 
1993
 1st Roc d'Azur

Road
1992
 2nd Grand Prix de la ville de Nogent-sur-Oise

References

External links

1962 births
Living people
French male cyclists
Sportspeople from Argenteuil
French mountain bikers
Cyclo-cross cyclists
Footballers from Val-d'Oise